Sudheer is an Indian given name.

People
Sudheer (Kannada actor)
Sudheer (Malayalam actor)
Sudheer Babu, Indian actor and former professional badminton player
Sudheer Karamana, Indian actor of Malayalam films 
Sudheer Sharma, Nepali author and journalist. 
Sudheer Varma, Indian film director in Telugu cinema
Sudigali Sudheer, Indian actor and television presenter

See also

 Sudhir